Show dogs may refer to:

show dog
Show Dogs, a 2018 film
Show Dog-Universal Music